Alain Hounsa (born 23 February 1988) is a Beninese football midfielder who plays for Ayema FC.

References

1988 births
Living people
Beninese footballers
Benin international footballers
AS Dragons FC de l'Ouémé players
Energie FC players
AS Oussou Saka players
USS Kraké players
Ayema FC players
Association football midfielders